The 2007 Phillip Island Superbike World Championship round was the second round of the 2007 Superbike World Championship. It took place on the weekend of 2–4 March 2007, at the 4.445 km Phillip Island Grand Prix Circuit in Australia.

Superbike race 1 classification

Superbike race 2 classification

Supersport classification

Notes

References

 Superbike Race 1
 Superbike Race 2
 Supersport Race

Phillip Island Round
Motorsport at Phillip Island
Superbike